Belu may refer to:

People 
Belu (Assyrian king), an early Assyrian king
Octavian Bellu (born 1951), Romanian gymnastics coach
Belu-Simion Fainaru (born 1959), Israeli sculptor born in Bucharest, Romania
Belu Zilber (1901–1978), Romanian communist activist

Other uses 
Belu (company), a bottled water company
Belu (province), former Portuguese name for eastern part of Timor island
Belu Regency, a regency in East Nusa Tenggara province of Indonesia
Alternative name of the demon Belial
Belu, Iran (disambiguation), places in Iran

See also
Bēlu
Belus (disambiguation)
Bellu (disambiguation)
Belo (disambiguation)